Domiporta sigillata is a species of sea snail, a marine gastropod mollusk in the family Mitridae, the miters or miter snails.

Description
The measured length of the shell is 21.8 mm.

Distribution

References

Mitridae
Gastropods described in 1965